Kongsberg Jazz Festival or Kongsberg Jazzfestival is an international jazz festival that has been held annually in Kongsberg, Norway, since 1964.

Artists 

Several worldwide great artists have visited Kongsberg during this festival; international stars including Chick Corea, Herbie Hancock, John Scofield, Nigel Kennedy, Niels-Henning Ørsted Pedersen, Dee Dee Bridgewater, Charles Mingus, Wayne Shorter, Dianne Reeves, McCoy Tyner, Radka Toneff, Bobby McFerrin, John Butcher, Anthony Braxton, Diana Krall and Pat Metheny have played in Kongsberg several times.

The festival is also an opportunity for young talented musicians to perform, and many now well-known Norwegian jazz-artists have begun their career in Kongsberg.

Awards 
The Kongsberg Jazz Award (also called the DNB award, established in 1996) is an award given to the most prominent Norwegian jazz artists of the year at the festival, given in cooperation with DNB.

Until 2011, the prize was 100,000 Norwegian kroner, but from 2012 it was raised to 300,000 Norwegian kroner, which makes it the largest jazz price in Norway.

The award has previously been named DnB NOR-prisen, Vital-prisen and KlartSvar-prisen, for who has sponsored the prize over the years.

The ceremony takes place at the jazz festival's last day. As part of the prize, the winner gives a concert at the festival the following year.

Award winners

References

External links 
 
 Tredobler jazzprisen  by Terje Mosnes at Dagbladet (in Norwegian)  

Jazz festivals in Norway
Kongsberg
Recurring events established in 1964
1964 establishments in Norway
1996 establishments in Norway
Awards established in 1996
Culture in Buskerud
Jazz awards
Norwegian music awards
Annual events in Norway
Summer events in Norway